Creeper was the first computer worm, while Reaper was the first antivirus software, designed to eliminate Creeper.

Creeper

Creeper was an experimental computer program written by Bob Thomas at BBN in 1971. Its original iteration was designed to move between DEC PDP-10 mainframe computers running the TENEX operating system using the ARPANET, with a later version by Ray Tomlinson designed to copy itself between computers rather than simply move. This self-replicating version of Creeper is generally accepted to be the first computer worm. Creeper was a test created to demonstrate the possibility of a self-replicating computer program that could spread to other computers.

The program was not actively malicious software as it caused no damage to data, the only effect being a message it output to the teletype reading "I'M THE CREEPER : CATCH ME IF YOU CAN"

Reaper

Reaper was the first anti-virus software, designed to delete Creeper by moving across the ARPANET. It was created by Ray Tomlinson in 1972.

Cultural impact
The conflict between Creeper and Reaper served as inspiration for the programming game Core War, while fictionalized versions of Reaper have been used as antagonists in the anime Digimon Tamers and the visual novel Digital: A Love Story. A humanized Creeper has also appeared in the webcomic Internet Explorer, alongside the likewise personified Morris Worm.

References 

ARPANET
Computer viruses
Computer-related introductions in 1971